The women's discus throw event at the 2005 European Athletics U23 Championships was held in Erfurt, Germany, at Steigerwaldstadion on 16 and 17 July.

Medalists

Results

Final
17 July

Qualifications
16 July
Qualifying 54.00 or 12 best to the Final

Group A

Group B

Participation
According to an unofficial count, 18 athletes from 13 countries participated in the event.

 (1)
 (1)
 (1)
 (3)
 (1)
 (2)
 (1)
 (1)
 (1)
 (3)
 (1)
 (1)
 (1)

References

Discus throw
Discus throw at the European Athletics U23 Championships